In mathematics, a Gelfand pair is a pair (G,K) consisting of a group G and a subgroup K (called an Euler subgroup of G) that satisfies a certain property on restricted representations. The theory of Gelfand pairs is closely related to the topic of spherical functions in the classical theory of special functions, and to the theory of Riemannian symmetric spaces in differential geometry. Broadly speaking, the theory exists to abstract from these theories their content in terms of harmonic analysis and representation theory.

When G is a finite group the simplest definition is, roughly speaking, that the (K,K)-double cosets in G commute. More precisely, the Hecke algebra, the algebra of functions on G that are invariant under translation on either side by K, should be commutative for the convolution on G.

In general, the definition of Gelfand pair is roughly that the restriction to K of any irreducible representation of G contains the trivial representation of K with multiplicity no more than 1. In each case one should specify the class of considered representations and the meaning of contains.

Definitions
In each area, the class of representations and the definition of containment for representations is slightly different. Explicit definitions in several such cases are given here.

Finite group case
When G is a finite group the following are equivalent

 (G,K) is a Gelfand pair.
 The algebra of (K,K)-double invariant functions on G with multiplication defined by convolution is commutative.
 For any irreducible representation π of G, the space πK of K-invariant vectors in π is no-more-than-1-dimensional.
 For any irreducible representation π of G, the dimension of HomK(π, C) is less than or equal to 1, where C denotes the trivial representation.
 The permutation representation of G on the cosets of K is multiplicity-free, that is, it decomposes into a direct sum of distinct absolutely irreducible representations in characteristic zero.
 The centralizer algebra (Schur algebra) of the permutation representation is commutative.
 (G/N, K/N) is a Gelfand pair, where N is a normal subgroup of G contained in K.

Compact group case
When G is a compact topological group the following are equivalent:

 (G,K) is a Gelfand pair.
 The algebra of (K,K)-double invariant compactly supported continuous measures on G with multiplication defined by convolution is commutative.
 For any continuous, locally convex, irreducible representation π of G, the space πK of K-invariant vectors in π is no-more-than-1-dimensional.
 For any continuous, locally convex, irreducible representation π of G the dimension of HomK(π,C) is less than or equal to 1.
 The representation L2(G/K) of G is multiplicity free i.e. it is a direct sum of distinct unitary irreducible representations.

Lie group with compact subgroup
When G is a Lie group and K is a compact subgroup the following are equivalent:

 (G,K) is a Gelfand pair.
 The algebra of (K,K)-double invariant compactly supported continuous measures on G with multiplication defined by convolution is commutative.
 The algebra D(G/K)K of K-invariant differential operators on G/K is commutative.
 For any continuous, locally convex, irreducible representation π of G, the space πK of K-invariant vectors in π is no-more-than-1-dimensional.
 For any continuous, locally convex, irreducible representation π of G the dimension of HomK(π, C) is less than or equal to 1.
 The representation L2(G/K) of G is multiplicity free i.e. it is a direct integral of distinct unitary irreducible representations.

For a classification of such Gelfand pairs see.

Classical examples of such Gelfand pairs are (G,K), where G is a reductive Lie group and K is a maximal compact subgroup.

Locally compact topological group with compact subgroup
When G is a locally compact topological group and K is a compact subgroup the following are equivalent:

 (G,K) is a Gelfand pair.
 The algebra of (K,K)-double invariant compactly supported continuous measures on G with multiplication defined by convolution is commutative.
 For any continuous locally convex irreducible representation π of G, the space πK of K-invariant vectors in π is no-more-than-1-dimensional.
 For any continuous, locally convex, irreducible representation π of G, the dimension of HomK(π, C) is less than or equal to 1.
 The representation L2(G/K) of G is multiplicity free i.e. it is a direct integral of distinct unitary irreducible representations.

In that setting, G has an Iwasawa-Monod decomposition, namely G = K P for some amenable subgroup P of G. This is the abstract analogue of the Iwasawa decomposition of semisimple Lie groups.

Lie group with closed subgroup
When G is a Lie group and K is a closed subgroup, the pair (G,K) is called a generalized Gelfand pair if for any irreducible unitary representation π of  G on a Hilbert space  the dimension of HomK(π, C) is less than or equal to 1, where π∞ denotes the subrepresentation of smooth vectors.

Reductive group over a local field with closed subgroup
When G is a reductive group over a local field and K is a closed subgroup, there are three (possibly non-equivalent) notions of Gelfand pair appearing in the literature. We will call them here GP1, GP2, and GP3.

GP1) For any irreducible admissible representation π of G the dimension of HomK(π, C) is less than or equal to 1.

GP2) For any irreducible admissible representation π of G we have , where  denotes the smooth dual.

GP3) For any irreducible unitary representation π of G on a Hilbert space the dimension of HomK(π, C) is less than or equal to 1.

Here, admissible representation is the usual notion of admissible representation when the local field is non-archimedean. When the local field is archimedean, admissible representation instead means smooth Fréchet representation of moderate growth such that the corresponding Harish-Chandra module is admissible.

If the local field is archimedean, then GP3 is the same as generalized Gelfand property defined in the previous case.

Clearly, GP1 ⇒ GP2 ⇒ GP3.

Strong Gelfand pairs
A pair (G,K) is called a strong Gelfand pair if the pair (G × K, ΔK) is a Gelfand pair, where ΔK ≤ G × K is the diagonal subgroup: {(k,k) in G × K : k in K}. Sometimes, this property is also called the multiplicity one property.

In each of the above cases can be adapted to strong Gelfand pairs. For example, let G be a finite group. Then the following are equivalent.

 (G,K) is a strong Gelfand pair.
 The algebra of functions on G invariant with respect to conjugation by K (with multiplication defined by convolution) is commutative.
 For any irreducible representation π of G and τ of K, the space HomK(τ,π) is no-more-than-1-dimensional.
 For any irreducible representation π of G and τ of K, the space HomK(π,τ) is no-more-than-1-dimensional.

Criteria for Gelfand property

Locally compact topological group with compact subgroup
In this case there is a classical criterion due to Gelfand for the pair (G,K) to be Gelfand: Suppose that there exists an involutive anti-automorphism σ of G s.t. any (K,K) double coset is σ invariant. Then the pair (G,K) is a Gelfand pair.

This criterion is equivalent to the following one: Suppose that there exists an involutive anti-automorphism σ of G such that any function on G which is invariant with respect to both right and left translations by K is σ invariant. Then the pair (G,K) is a Gelfand pair.

Reductive group over a local field with closed subgroup
In this case there is a criterion due to Gelfand and Kazhdan for the pair (G,K) to satisfy GP2. Suppose that there exists an involutive anti-automorphism σ of G such that any (K,K)-double invariant distribution on G is σ-invariant. Then the pair (G,K) satisfies GP2. See.

If the above statement holds only for positive definite distributions then the pair satisfies GP3 (see the next case).

The property GP1 often follows from GP2. For example, this holds if there exists an involutive anti-automorphism of  G that preserves K and preserves every closed conjugacy class. For G = GL(n) the transposition can serve as such involution.

Lie group with closed subgroup
In this case there is the following criterion for the pair (G,K) to be generalized Gelfand pair. Suppose that there exists an involutive anti-automorphism σ of  G s.t. any K × K invariant positive definite distribution on G is σ-invariant. Then the pair (G,K) is a generalized Gelfand pair. See.

Criteria for strong Gelfand property
All the above criteria can be turned into criteria for strong Gelfand pairs by replacing the two-sided action of K × K by the conjugation action of K.

Twisted Gelfand pairs
A generalization of the notion of Gelfand pair is the notion of twisted Gelfand pair. Namely a pair (G,K) is called a twisted Gelfand pair with respect to the character χ of the group K, if the Gelfand property holds true when the trivial representation is replaced with the character χ. For example, in case when K is compact it meanes that the dimension of HomK(π, χ)) is less than or equal to 1. One can adapt the criterion for Gelfand pairs to the case of twisted Gelfand pairs.

Symmetric pairs
The Gelfand property is often satisfied by symmetric pairs.

A pair (G,K) is called a symmetric pair if there exists an involutive automorphism θ of  G such that K is a union of connected components of the group of θ-invariant elements: Gθ.

If G is a connected reductive group over R and K=Gθ is a compact subgroup then (G,K) is a Gelfand pair. Example: G = GL(n,R) and K = O(n,R), the subgroup of orthogonal matrices.

In general, it is an interesting question when a symmetric pair of a reductive group over a local field has the Gelfand property. For symmetric pairs of rank one this question was investigated in and

An example of high rank Gelfand symmetric pair is (GL(n+k), GL(n) × GL(k)). This was proven in over non-archimedean local fields and later in for all local fields of characteristic zero.

For more details on this question for high rank symmetric pairs see.

Spherical pairs
In the context of algebraic groups the analogs of Gelfand pairs are called spherical pair. Namely, 
a pair (G,K) of algebraic groups is called a spherical pair if one of the following equivalent conditions holds.

 There exists an open (B,K)-double coset in G, where B is the Borel subgroup of G.
 For any algebraic representation π of G, we have dim .

In this case the space G/H is called spherical space.

It is conjectured that any spherical pair (G,K) over a local field satisfies the following weak version of the Gelfand property:
For any admissible representation π of G, the space HomK(π,C) is finite-dimensional. Moreover, the bound for this dimension does not depend on π. This conjecture is proven for a large class of spherical pairs including all the symmetric pairs.

Applications

Classification
Gelfand pairs are often used for classification of irreducible representations in the following way: Let (G,K) be a Gelfand pair. An irreducible representation of G called K-distinguished if HomK(π,C) is 1-dimensional. The representation Ind(C) is a model for all K-distinguished representations i.e. any K-distinguished representation appears there with multiplicity exactly 1. A similar notion exists for twisted Gelfand pairs.

Example: If G is a reductive group over a local field and K is its maximal compact subgroup, then K distinguished representations are called spherical, such representations can be classified via the Satake correspondence. The notion of spherical representation is in the basis of the notion of Harish-Chandra module.

Example: If G is split reductive group over a local field and K is its maximal unipotent subgroup then the pair (G,K) is twisted Gelfand pair w.r.t. any non-degenerate character ψ (see,). In this case K-distinguished representations are called generic (or non-degenerate) and they are easy to classify. Almost any irreducible representation is generic. The unique (up to scalar) imbedding of a generic representation to Ind(ψ) is called a Whittaker model.

In the case of G=GL(n) there is a finer version of the result above, namely there exist a finite sequence of subgroups Ki and characters   s.t. (G,Ki) is twisted Gelfand pair w.r.t.  and any irreducible unitary representation is Ki distinguished for exactly one i (see,)

Gelfand–Zeitlin construction

One can also use Gelfand pairs for constructing bases for irreducible representations: suppose we have a sequence {1} ⊂ G1 ⊂ ... ⊂ Gn s.t. (Gi,Gi-1) is a strong Gelfand pair. For simplicity let's assume that Gn is compact. Then this gives a canonical decomposition of any irreducible representation of Gn to one-dimensional subrepresentations. When Gn = U(n) (the unitary group) this construction is called Gelfand Zeitlin basis. Since the representations of U(n) are the same as algebraic representations of GL(n) so we also obtain a basis of any algebraic irreducible representation of GL(n). However one should be aware that the constructed basis isn't canonical as it depends on the choice of the embeddings U(i) ⊂ U(i+1).

Splitting of periods of automorphic forms
A more recent use of Gelfand pairs is for splitting of periods of automorphic forms.

Let G be a reductive group defined over a global field F and let K be an algebraic subgroup of G. Suppose that for any place   of F the pair (G, K) is a Gelfand pair over the completion . Let m be an automorphic form over G, then its H-period splits as a product of local factors (i.e. factors that depends only on the behavior of m at each place ).

Now suppose we are given a family of automorphic forms with a complex parameter s. Then the period of those forms is an analytic function which splits into a product of local factors. Often this means that this function is a certain L-function and this gives an analytic continuation and functional equation for this L-function.

Remark: usually those periods do not converge and one should regularize them.

Generalization of representation theory
A possible approach to representation theory is to consider representation theory of a group G as a harmonic analysis on the group G w.r.t. the two sided action of G × G. Indeed, to know all the irreducible representations of G is equivalent to know the decomposition of the space of functions on G as a G × G representation. In this approach representation theory can be generalized by replacing the pair (G × G, G) by any spherical pair (G,K). Then we will be led to the question of harmonic analysis on the space G/K w.r.t. the action of G.

Now the Gelfand property for the pair (G,K) is an analog of the Schur's lemma.

Using this approach one can take any concepts of representation theory and generalize them to the case of spherical pair. For example, the relative trace formula is obtained from the trace formula by this procedure.

Examples

Finite groups
A few common examples of Gelfand pairs are:
 (Sym(n+1), Sym(n)), the symmetric group acting on n+1 points and a point stabilizer that is naturally isomorphic to on n points.
 (AGL(n, q), GL(n, q)), the affine (general linear) group and a point stabilizer that is naturally isomorphic to the general linear group.

If (G,K) is a Gelfand pair, then (G/N,K/N) is a Gelfand pair for every G-normal subgroup N of K. For many purposes it suffices to consider K without any such non-identity normal subgroups.

This gives rise to a class of examples of finite groups with Gelfand pairs: the 2-transitive groups. A permutation group G is 2-transitive if the stabilizer K of a point acts transitively on the remaining points. In particular, G the symmetric group on n+1 points and K the symmetric group on n points forms a Gelfand pair for every n≥1. This follows because the character of a 2-transitive permutation action is of the form 1+χ for some irreducible character χ and the trivial character 1, .

If G is a primitive group of degree twice a prime with point stabilizer K, then again (G,K) is a Gelfand pair, .

Roughly speaking, K must be contained as a subgroup of small index in one of the following groups unless n is smaller than 18: Sym(n - k)× Sym(k), Sym(n/2) wr Sym(2), Sym(2) wr Sym(n/2) for n even, Sym(n - 5) × AGL(1,5), Sym(n - 6) × PGL(2,5), or Sym(n - 9) × PΓL(2,8). Gelfand pairs for classical groups have been investigated as well.

Symmetric pairs with compact K
 (GL(n,R), O(n,R))
 (GL(n,C), U(n))
 (O(n+k,R), O(n,R) × O(k,R))
 (U(n+k), U(n) × U(k))
 (G,K) where G is a reductive Lie group and K is a maximal compact subgroup.

Symmetric Gelfand pairs of rank one
Let F be a local field of characteristic zero.

 (SL(n+1,F), GL(n,F)) for n > 5.
 (Sp(2n+2,F), Sp(2n,F)) × Sp(2,F)) for n > 4.
 (SO(V ⊕ F), SO(V)) where V is a vector space over F with a non-degenerate quadratic form.

Symmetric pairs of high rank
Let F be a local field of characteristic zero. Let G be a reductive group over F. The following are examples of symmetric Gelfand pairs of high rank:

 (G × G, ΔG): Follows from Schur's lemma.
 (GL(n+k,F), GL(n,F) × GL(k,F)).
 (GL(2n,F), Sp(2n,F)).
 (O(n+k,C), O(n,C) × O(k,C)).
 (GL(n,C), O(n,C)).
 (GL(n,E), GL(n,F)), where E is a quadratic extension of F.

Strong Gelfand pairs
The following pairs are strong Gelfand pairs:

 (Sym(n+1), Sym(n)), this is proven using the involutive anti-automorphism g ↦ g−1.
 (GL(n+1,F), GL(n,F)) where F is a local field of characteristic zero.
 (O(V ⊕ F), O(V)) where V is a vector space over F with a non-degenerate quadratic form.
 U(V ⊕ E), U(V)) where E is a quadratic extension of F and V is a vector space over E with a non-degenerate hermitian form.

Those four examples can be rephrased as the statement that the following are Gelfand pairs:

 (Sym(n+1) × Sym(n), Δ Sym(n)).
 (GL(n+1,F) × GL(n,F), Δ GL(n,F))
 (O(V ⊕ F) × O(V), Δ O(V))
 (U(V ⊕ E) × U(V), Δ U(V))

See also
 spherical function
 Symmetric pair
 Spherical pair

Notes

References
 
 
 
 
 

Representation theory of groups
Representation theory of Lie groups
Harmonic analysis